Whashton is a village and civil parish in the Richmondshire district of North Yorkshire, England.

History
The name is of an uncertain origin and could either be taken from a personal name (Hwaessa) or the farm/settlement at the sharp, pointed place (Hwaessing). The village (with an older spelling) is sometimes cited as the origin of the family name of George Washington, the first US President.

The Hack & Spade public house was established by 1880.

Farming 
The village is surrounded by farmland and has two main farms the Hagg which is down a track away from the main village. The farm  caters for pig farming with a residential property on site (part of the Hartforth estate)
and another Whashton Farm set in the main village catering for cows.

Village 
The village has a pub 'The Hack and Spade', however that is the only village amenity apart from a post box. The village is set on several walks around the surrounding Yorkshire hills.

References

External links
Whashton families recorded in the 1861 and 1891

Villages in North Yorkshire
Civil parishes in North Yorkshire